Justice Mansfield may refer to:

Edward Mansfield (judge), associate justice of the Iowa Supreme Court
William W. Mansfield, associate justice of the Arkansas Supreme Court